Miss America 1954, the 27th Miss America pageant, was held at the Boardwalk Hall in Atlantic City, New Jersey on September 12, 1953. Though four women from Pennsylvania had previously held the title (1924, 1935, 1936, 1940), Evelyn Margaret Ay was the first Miss Pennsylvania to be crowned Miss America, as the others represented cities.

Actress and princess-to-be Grace Kelly was one of the year's judges.

A Top 10 finisher in the pageant, Miriam Stevenson, subsequently won the 1954 Miss USA pageant, representing South Carolina. She then proceeded to be crowned Miss Universe 1954.

Similarly, Carlene King Johnson, unsuccessful as Miss Vermont in the 1954 Miss America pageant, became Miss USA 1955.

Results

Placements

Awards

Preliminary awards

Other awards

Contestants

References

External links
 Miss America official website

1954
1953 in the United States
1954 beauty pageants
1953 in New Jersey
September 1953 events in the United States
Events in Atlantic City, New Jersey